Hydrangea aspera is a species of flowering plant in the family Hydrangeaceae, native to the region between the Himalayas, across southern China, to Taiwan. The flowers are typically borne in large flat heads in late summer, and are in variable shades of pale blue and pink, fringed by white or pale pink sterile florets.

The Latin aspera means "rough-textured" and refers to the downy lower surface of the leaves.

Cultivation
The plant is widely cultivated, and favours a sheltered position in acid or neutral soil, with best growth often in partial or afternoon shade.  The leaves, in some forms exceeding 30.5 cm (12 inches) long, are vulnerable to drying winds as well as mechanical wind damage.  Numerous cultivars have been produced as ornamental subjects for parks and gardens.  They include:

 'Anthony Bullivent'
 'Longipes'
 'Mauvette'
 'Peter Chappell'
 'The Ditch'
 

In addition to forms of garden origin, various forms of wild origin are cultivated such as Kawakamii, Macrophylla, Robusta, Sargentiana, Strigosa, and Villosa.  Phenotype for plant images returned by a web search on such terms can vary widely, a sign of unsettled taxonomy or complex expression of forms due to wide geographic ranges or other factors, with some authorities giving full species status, e. g. H. robusta and H. longipes, whereas other sources assign subspecies, e.g. H. aspera ssp. robusta, or H. aspera Kawakamii (example list of Hydrangea from collections).

The cultivar H. aspera 'Macrophylla' (not to be confused with H. macrophylla) has gained the Royal Horticultural Society's Award of Garden Merit.

References

aspera
Plants described in 1825